The men's pole vault at the 2018 IAAF World Indoor Championships took place on 4 March 2018.

Summary
Only 15 competitors meant only a final was held. Several notable names were eliminated early on;  2015 World Champion Shawnacy Barber; 2016 Olympic champion Thiago Braz da Silva;  world junior record holder Armand Duplantis;  2014 World Indoor Champion Konstantinos Filippidis; 2011 World Champion Paweł Wojciechowski; and 2013 World Champion Raphael Holzdeppe. Young newcomers Kurtis Marschall and Emmanouil Karalis cleared personal bests of 5.80m to be among the last contenders. The medalists were decided by a first attempt clearance at 5.85m, by Piotr Lisek, Sam Kendricks and Renaud Lavillenie. At that point, Lavillenie was still clean placing him in first place, Kendricks had one miss for second and Lisek had two misses for third. Six other vaulters had attempts left, many strategically passing to 5.90m after the clearances, but none were able to clear another height. Kendricks took one attempt for the win at 5.95m but in the end the podium in 2018 was exactly the same as in 2016.

Records

Schedule

Results
The final was started at 15:00.

References

Pole vault
Pole vault at the World Athletics Indoor Championships